Alf Torp (September 27, 1853 – September 26, 1916) was a Norwegian philologist and author. He is most known for his work with Indo-European and Nordic language history and meaning of ancient languages.

Biography
Alf Torp was born in  Stryn, Sogn og Fjordane, Norway. He became cand. philol. in 1877 at the Bergen Cathedral School.  He was a student of Sophus Bugge, and during a stay in Leipzig in 1878-80 a student of Georg Curtius and Ernst Windisch. In 1881 he got his doctorate at the University of Leipzig with the dissertation Die Flexion des Pali in ihrem Verhältnis zum Sanskrit. 

He taught at the University of Oslo from 1883 and in 1894 he became professor in Sanskrit and comparative linguistics. He published numerous papers about the inscriptions in various languages including  Etruscan, Phrygian, Venetic, Lycian and Hittite. In 1905, he was appointed Knight of 1 Class of Order of St. Olav 1905 

Among many other works, in 1903-06 he published Etymologisk ordbog over det norske og det danske sprog (Etymological dictionary of the Norwegian and Danish languages) together with Norwegian linguist, Hjalmar Falk (1859-1928). It was the only Norwegian etymological dictionary for nearly a hundred years, until it was replaced  in 2000 Våre arveord - etymologisk ordbok by Harald Bjorvand and Fredrik Otto Lindeman.

Selected works
 Die Flexion des Pali in ihrem Verhältnis zum Sanskrit, 1881
 Vokal- og Konsonantstammer, 1889
 Zu den phrygischen Inschriften aus römischer Zeit, 1894
 Zum Phrygischen, 1896
 Indogermanische Forschungen, 1897
 Etruskische Monatsdaten, 1902
 Bemerkungen zu der etruskischen Inschrift von S. Maria di Capua, 1905
 Gamalnorsk ordavleiding, 1909 
 Nynorsk etymologisk ordbok, 1919

References

1853 births
1916 deaths
People from Stryn
Linguists from Norway
Norwegian lexicographers
People educated at the Bergen Cathedral School
Norwegian expatriates in Germany
Leipzig University alumni
Members of the Royal Society of Sciences in Uppsala